Frank McKelvey (3 June 1895 – 30 June 1974) was an Irish painter from Belfast.

McKelvey was born in 1895 in Belfast, the son of a painter and decorator. He attended the Belfast School of Art and won the "Sir Charles Brett" prize for figure drawing there in 1912. By 1918 his work was exhibited at the Royal Hibernian Academy and in 1921 he was elected a member of the Belfast Art Society. McKelvey was appointed an associate of the RHA in 1923, being granted full membership in 1930. During his career McKelvey was considered on a par with Paul Henry and James Humbert Craig, two of the most successful Irish landscape painters of the time. He was elected as one of the first academicians of the Ulster Academy of Arts when it was founded in 1930. McKelvey died on 30 June 1974.

References

External links

McKelvey at Artnet

1895 births
1974 deaths
Irish Impressionist painters
20th-century Irish painters
Irish male painters
Painters from Northern Ireland
Artists from Belfast
Alumni of Belfast School of Art
Alumni of Ulster University
Members of the Royal Ulster Academy
20th-century Irish male artists